Une is a municipality and town of Colombia in the Eastern Province, part of the department of Cundinamarca. The municipality borders Chipaque in the north, Cáqueza and Fosca in the east, Fosca and Gutiérrez in the south and Bogotá in the west.

Etymology 
The name Une is derived from Chibcha and means "Drop it" or "mud".

Geology and geography 
Une is situated in the Eastern Ranges of the Colombian Andes. In the municipality outcrops the Une Formation, a marine quartz-rich sandstone, an important oil-bearing formation of Colombia.

History 
Une in the times before the Spanish conquest was inhabited by the Muisca.

Modern Une was founded on February 23, 1538 by Diego Romero de Aguilar.

Economy 
Main economical activities of Une are agriculture and livestock farming. Important agricultural products cultivated are potatoes, onions, carrots, peas and coriander.

References 

Municipalities of Cundinamarca Department
Populated places established in 1538
1538 establishments in the Spanish Empire
1538 disestablishments in the Muisca Confederation
Muysccubun